The Stanhope Memorandum was a document written by Edward Stanhope, the Secretary of State for War of the United Kingdom of Great Britain and Ireland, on 8 December 1888. It set out the overall strategic aims of the British Empire, and the way the British Army was to be employed towards these aims.

It gave the priorities of the Army, in order, as:

 the support of the civil power in the United Kingdom
 the provision of reinforcements for India
 the provision of garrison units for fortresses, colonies and coaling stations
 the provision of two corps for home defence
 the ability to deploy one of these two corps for service in a European war

References

The Stanhope Memorandum of 1888: a Reinterpretation. Ian F. W. Beckett: in Historical Research, Vol. 57 Iss. 136, Pages 240-7. Full text (PDF)
"The Stanhope Memorandum", p.311 of The Victorians at war, 1815-1914, by Harold E. Raugh. Published by ABC-CLIO, 2004. 

19th-century history of the British Army
19th-century military history of the United Kingdom
1888 in the United Kingdom
1888 documents
1888 in military history
British defence policymaking